Me & Mr. Sutton is a release by Luke Vibert under the alias Plug.

Track listing

CD
"Cut (Plug Remix)" - 8:05
"Me And Mr. Jones (Boymerang Remix)" - 5:29
Remix: Boymerang
"Cut (Original Mix)" - 7:19

12" vinyl
Side A
"Cut (Plug '97 Remix)" - 8:00
Side AA
"Me & Mr. Jones (Boymerang Remix)" - 5:27
Remix: Boymerang

1997 EPs
Luke Vibert EPs